Schinia coercita is a moth of the family Noctuidae. It is found in North America, including Arizona and California.

The wingspan is about 23 mm.

External links
Images

Schinia
Moths of North America
Moths described in 1881

Taxa named by Augustus Radcliffe Grote